The Eastern Junior Hockey League (EJHL) was a USA Hockey-sanctioned Tier III Junior A ice hockey league. Founded in 1993 by Dan Esdale, the EJHL had fourteen teams from across the Northeastern United States. The EJHL champion then competed for the National Championship against the champions of the other Tier III leagues and a host city. The New Jersey Hitmen were the final EJHL Champions after the 2012–13 season.

History
The league was formed in 1993 with the NECDL Classics, the Rhode Island Sharks, the Tyngsborough Huskies, the Matt O'Neil Lightning, the Granite State Stars and the Springfield Olympics.  The following year the Niagara Scenics joined the league from the North American Hockey League.  The Scenics later left for the Metro Junior A Hockey League in Ontario.  In the subsequent years, the league has added the Bridgewater Bandits (1996); Valley Jr. Warriors (1996); NY Apple Core (1997); Capital District (1999); Bay State Breakers (1999); Junior Bruins (1999); Green Mountain Glades (2000); NJ Hitmen (2004) and the Syracuse Stars (2005 and later moved to Rochester in 2010) who joined from the Ontario Provincial Junior A Hockey League. The league has quickly been gaining prestige across the United States as teams such as the Hitmen and Monarchs compete with other top junior teams.

However, during the 2012–13 season, EJHL members the Boston Junior Bruins, Islanders Hockey Club (formerly Middlesex Islanders), New Jersey Hitmen, and the South Shore Kings announced they were forming a new league called the United States Premier Hockey League. They would eventually be followed by the Bay State Breakers and the Portland Jr. Pirates from the EJHL while adding other teams to make up the Premier Division of the USPHL. The EJHL would disband when the Boston Bandits, Connecticut Oilers, New Hampshire Junior Monarchs, New York Apple Core, Philadelphia Revolution, and the Valley Jr. Warriors joined the Atlantic Junior Hockey League which would rename itself to the Eastern Hockey League.

Teams
Teams that played in the final 2012–13 season.

Champions
The winning team in the EJHL was awarded the Gary Dineen Cup, named for Gary Dineen, one of the founders of the New England Junior Hockey League (1973–1989, an indirect predecessor of the EJHL), and of the EJHL New England Junior Falcons.

1994 NECDL Classics
1995 Niagara Scenics
1996 NE Jr. Whalers
1997 NE Jr. Whalers
1998 NE Jr. Coyotes
1999 Walpole Stars
2000 NE Jr. Coyotes
2001 Walpole Stars
2002 NH Jr. Monarchs
2003 NY Apple Core
2004 NH Jr. Monarchs
2005 Junior Bruins
2006 NH Jr. Monarchs
2007 NH Jr. Monarchs
2008 NJ Hitmen
2009 NJ Hitmen
2010 NH Jr. Monarchs
2011 NH Jr. Monarchs
2012 NH Jr. Monarchs
2013 NJ Hitmen
source:

Timeline of teams
 Matt O'Neil Lightning (1993–98), became Boston Harbor Wolves became Boston Jr. Shamrocks, became the Philadelphia Revolution
 Tyngsboro Huskies (1993–2001), became Lowell Jr. Lock Monsters (2001–2004), became New England Jr. Huskies
 Springfield Olympics (Pics) became New England Jr. Whalers became New England Jr. Coyotes became New England Jr. Falcons
 New England College Development League (NECDL) Classics (1993–1997), became Walpole Stars (1997–2006), became Foxboro Stars (2006–2007), became South Shore Kings (2007–present)
 Niagara Scenic (1994–1995)
 Rhode Island Sharks (1993–1998) folded after the 1997-1998 season
 Granite State Stars (1993–1996), became Great Northern Snow Devils (1996–1999) became Exeter Snow Devils (1999–2001), became New Hampshire Jr. Monarchs
 Green Mountain Glades (2000–2012), became the Portland Jr. Pirates
 New England Junior Huskies (1995–2012), became the Middlesex Islanders
 Capital District Selects (1996–2012), became the Connecticut Oilers
 Syracuse Stars (2005–2009), moved to Rochester to become the Rochester Stars (2010–2013) and Rochester Jr. Americans (2013–2016)

References

External links
Official USA Hockey Website
Commonwealth of Massachusetts Corporations Listing, incorporated in 2003
Articles of incorporation
USA Hockey Magazine Issue 0405 (Apr 05), "The Beast of the East"
Gary Dineen Hockey School

3